Hexasulfur is an inorganic chemical with the chemical formula .

Nomenclature 

The name hexasulfur is the most commonly used and preferred IUPAC name and is constructed according to the compositional nomenclature, and cyclohexasulfane. It is also the final member of the thiane heterocyclic series, where every carbon atom is substituted with a sulfur atom, thus the systematic name hexathiane, a valid IUPAC name, is constructed according to the substitutive nomenclature. Another valid IUPAC systematic name cyclo-hexasulfur is constructed according to the additive nomenclature.

Structure 
This chemical consists of rings of 6 sulfur atoms. It is thus a simple cyclosulfane and an allotrope of sulfur. Hexasulfur adopts a chair configuration similar to that of cyclohexane, with bond angles of 102.2°. The sulfur atoms are equivalent.

References 

Six-membered rings
Allotropes of sulfur